Binuria is a village in Birbhum district  in the state of West Bengal, India.It is about 150 kilometers far away from Kolkata but only 6 kilometers away from our well known Santiniketan as well as Visva-Bharati University founded by Rabindranath Tagore.

History
This is an old village in history. From the time of the British it has presence in Birbhum. But then its name was then Binuri. After 30 years of getting independence of India it changed to Binuria officially.

Geography

Position

The geographical coordinate of the village is 23° 40′ 6″ N, 87° 37′ 57″ E.It is 8kilometer west from Bolpur and Santiniketan.
The natural view of this village is beautiful. This village is surrounded by green trees and ponds. A main road passes through the village. A canal and the Kopai river passes through the two opposite ends of the village. In the east of the village there is a forest. There are two other villages are there touching Binuria, they are Lohagarh and Bahadurpur.

Climate
This village is made of red soil, so it is hot in summer. It crosses its temperature above 40 °C in April to June. But in winter it drops to 5 - 10 °C. Rainfall is the same as the rest of Birbhum district.

Peoples
According to the census India 2011, 565 households are there in this village with the population of 2592. From which 1308 males and 1284 females. Demographic categories include SC, ST, and Gen. This village's colonies include Majhipara, Borigpara, and Goraipara.

Economy
Most residents are involved in agriculture and daily labour. Some of them run grocery shops, saloons, sweet stores, clothing stores, etc. A few people have government or public jobs. There is a market called Mechhobazar, which is beside the road passing through the village.

Culture and festivals

Festivals
All types of Bengali festivals villagers enjoy there, like Durga Puja, Kali Puja, and nabanna. Saontal people enjoy their batna festival. A Mela happens there in every year in the start of the summer. Durga Mandir, Gour Mandir, Shiv Mandir, and Swasan Mandir temples are there.

Education
There are two high schools in the village, one for boys and other for girls. They are Binuria N.B High School and Binuria Sumitra Balika Bidyalaya. Except these one primary, one child school and an Anganwary center is available here. One public library named Jana Ajana Granthagar is available in the village. Though there are four schools in the village, only 60 percent of the population is educated.

Sports
Mobile and computer games are more popular than outdoor games. But people play volleyball and football or organize inter-village tournaments. Children are losing interest in the 20th-century games of hide and seek, kho kho, buri choo, dang guli, etc. Rural Extension Center, Visva Bharati arranges an annual sports of Bratochari in the time of Magh Mela (6, 7, 8 February) every year. Binuria also participate in the sports with significant presence.

Official view

Information
 There are two societies in the village, Binuria Mandirtala Jagriti Sangha and Binuria Mahila Samity. Both are registered under the government of West Bengal. There is a teen club, named Binuria Dreamlight Teen Club under Nehru Yuva Kendra in Delhi.

External links
 http://censusindia.gov.in/PopulationFinder/Sub_Districts_Master.aspx?state_code=19&district_code=08

Villages in Birbhum district